Charles Herbert Sweatman (29 July 1873 – 11 June 1915) was an Australian rules footballer who played with Carlton in the Victorian Football League (VFL).

Football
He played 30 games over three seasons with Carlton. As was the case with another Carlton footballer, George Henry Ward (1876–1934), whose family name is mistakenly identified in all official contemporary VFL records as "Warde", Sweatman is mistakenly identified in all contemporary VFL records as "Tom Sweetman", Both of these were clerical errors.

On 1 May 1900 "C.H. Sweatman" was granted a clearance from Carlton to Essendon Town.

On 22 May 1905, "C.H. Sweetman" was granted a clearance from Essendon Town to the Boulder City Football Club in the Goldfields Football League in Western Australia.

In June 1908, "C. Sweetman" was granted a clearance from Boulder City to the Brighton Football Club. Although he was (apparently) selected in the team, he did not play for Brighton in the match against Northcote on 27 June 1908.

Outside football
The son of John Sweatman (-1925), and Amelia Ann Sweatman (-1917), née Rixon, Charles Herbert Sweatman was born on 29 July 1873.

He married Elizabeth Margaret Critney Kinley (1872-1927) in 1899. (She remarried in 1920, and became Mrs. William Robinson).

He died (suddenly), of heart failure, at the Echuca District Hospital on 11 June 1915.

Footnotes

References
 
 Maplestone, M., Flying Higher: History of the Essendon Football Club 1872–1996, Essendon Football Club, (Melbourne), 1996.

External links 
 Charles Sweatman's playing statistics from AFL Tables (N.B. lists him as "Tom Sweetman").
 "Charlie Sweatman's" profile at AustralianFootball.com
 "Charlie Sweatman's" profile at Blueseum
 "C.H. Sweetman", at The VFA Project.

1873 births
1915 deaths
Australian rules footballers from Melbourne
Carlton Football Club players
People from Ascot Vale, Victoria